Alsike is a locality situated in Knivsta Municipality, Uppsala County, Sweden with 2,681 inhabitants in 2010. Alsike is located about 50 km north of Stockholm and only 25 km away from Arlanda Airport. It is also the location of Alsike Abbey. Alsike is located on the Ingegerdsleden, a historic pilgrimage route between Uppsala Cathedral and Storkyrkan in Stockholm. Alsike clover gets its common name from Alsike, Sweden.

References

See also
Alsike Church
Uppland Runic Inscription Fv1948;168

Populated places in Uppsala County
Populated places in Knivsta Municipality